Captain Bruce Boutlier McLean (August 22, 1858June 24, 1930) was a 19th-century Boston maritime pilot, best known for being a pilot on the pilot boat America. He was a leader among the branch pilots of Boston for 35 years. McLean was a pilot and owner of the pilot boat Liberty. He died in Everett, Massachusetts in 1930.

Early life

Bruce B. McLean was born in Hubbards, Nova Scotia on August 22, 1858. He was the son of John McLean and Johanna McLean. He married Laura Janet Rutledge on December 20, 1893, in Boston, Massachusetts. They had three children.

Career

McLean went out to sea at an early age. He received his pilot commission on March 13, 1895.

McLean was a pilot on the pilot boat Minerva when she took her trial trip from the National dock at East Boston on March 14, 1896.

McLean knew many of the Boston pilots. On October 1, 1906, he went to the funeral of his friend Captain  James L. Smith who died, at age 56 at his home in Arlington, Massachusetts. The other Boston pilots that attended the funeral were, Captain William V. Abbott, Captain James Murdock, Captain Watson S. Dolliver, Captain F. C. Lefray, and Captain George W. Lawlor.

America

McLean was best known for being a pilot on the pilot boat America, No. 1. Pilots McLean and James H. Reid, Jr., were assigned to the new boat when she was launched from the shipyard of John Bishop of Gloucester, Massachusetts on March 9, 1897. 

On April 1, 1898, Captain McLean was in command of the pilot boat America when he rescued the crew of the Nova Scotia vessel Genius, 18 miles off the Boston Light. The rescued men were transferred from the America to the pilot-boat Hesper, No. 5.

On December 10, 1898, Pilot McLean, cruising on the America, No. 1, and boarding the steamship Linchenden from Nicaragua, reported seeing part of the wreckage from the ship Virginian, which was 14 miles from the Highland Light, off cape Cod. He could see the letters Virginian on the stern of the wreckage. She ship was lost at sea with all on board.

In 1900, the pilot boat Louise, No. 2 was owned by Bruce McLean, Joseph Fawcett, John Fawcett, William V. Abbott and Watson S. Dolliver.

Liberty

On April 10, 1902, McLean was a pallbearer at the funeral for Captain E. G. Martin. along with James M. Murdock, John H. Low, C. K. Nelson, F. J. Gevalt, and William McMillian. They were also pilots of the Captain Martin's pilot boat Liberty, No. 3. 

On May 4, 1917, a  model of the pilot boat Liberty was presented by the pilots of Boston Harbor. McLean helped to produce the model. 

On December 25, 1918, Captain McLean boarded the four-masted Norwegian bark Skansen I, and told the captain and crew that World War I had ended. The vessel had been out at sea and was not aware of the signing of the Armistice on November 11, 1918.

Death

McLean died on June 24, 1930 in Everett, Massachusetts at age 71 years. Funeral services were at his late residence.

See also
 List of Northeastern U. S. Pilot Boats

References 

 

Sea captains
Maritime pilotage
1930 deaths
1858 births
People from the Halifax Regional Municipality